Lakewood Elementary School may refer to:

Canada
  Lakewood Elementary School in Langford, British Columbia

United States
Lakewood School in Lakewood, California
  Lakewood Elementary School in Lodi, California
  Lakewood Elementary School in Modesto, California
  Lakewood Elementary School] in Sunnyvale, California
  Lakewood Elementary School] in unincorporated Hardin County, Kentucky
  Lakewood Elementary School in Ann Arbor, Michigan
  Lakewood Elementary School] in unincorporated Oakland County, Michigan
  Lakewood Elementary School in New City, New York
  Lakewood Elementary (DPS) School in Durham, North Carolina
  Lakewood Elementary School in Surfside Beach, South Carolina
 Lakewood Elementary School (Dallas, Texas)
 Lakewood Elementary School (Euless), Texas
  Lakewood Elementary School in unincorporated Harris County, Texas
  Lakewood Elementary School in Houston, Texas
  Lakewood Elementary School in Temple, Texas
Lakewood Elementary School (Washington) in Marysville, Washington
 Lakewood Elementary School in Luling, Louisiana

In fiction
Lakewood Elementary School, a fictional school in the American-Canadian children's television series Arthur